Haugerud is a Norwegian surname, derived from the Old Norse word haugr meaning hill, knoll, or mound. Related derivatives include the common Norwegian surnames Haugan, Hauge and Haugen. Haugerud can refer to:

People
Johs Haugerud (1896–1971), Norwegian politician
Rita Haugerud (born 1919), Norwegian politician
Howard E. Haugerud (born 1924), American diplomat
Neil Sherman Haugerud (1930–2019), American politician

Places
Haugerud, Oslo
Haugerud (station), Oslo

Norwegian-language surnames